Uriah Bentick (born 5 February 1989) is a Trinidadian footballer who plays for Fredericksburg Fire FC in Major Arena Soccer League 3.

Career

College and amateur
Bentick was born in Port of Spain, Trinidad and Tobago, and played four years of college soccer at Liberty University between 2009 and 2012.

Professional
Bentick was drafted 17th in the 2013 MLS Supplemental Draft by the Philadelphia Union, but did not earn a contract with the team.

Bentick signed with USL Pro club Wilmington Hammerheads in April 2013.

On July 24, 2015, Bentick signed with the Richmond Kickers.

References

External links
 Liberty profile

1989 births
Living people
Liberty Flames men's soccer players
Trinidad and Tobago footballers
Trinidad and Tobago expatriate footballers
Wilmington Hammerheads FC players
North Carolina FC players
Richmond Kickers players
Expatriate soccer players in the United States
Philadelphia Union draft picks
USL Championship players
North American Soccer League players
Association football defenders
Trinidad and Tobago expatriate sportspeople in the United States
National Premier Soccer League players
Indoor soccer players